Nong Ya Sai is a district (amphoe) in the western part of Suphan Buri province, central Thailand.

History
The minor district (king amphoe) was created on 1 June 1983, when the four tambons Nong Ya Sai, Nong Rathawat, Nong Pho, and Chaeng Ngam were split off from Sam Chuk district. It was upgraded to a full district on 21 May 1990.

Geography
Neighboring districts are (from the north clockwise) Dan Chang, Doem Bang Nang Buat, Sam Chuk, and Don Chedi of Suphan Buri Province, and Lao Khwan of Kanchanaburi province

Administration

Central administration 
Nong Ya Sai is divided into six sub-districts (tambons), which are further subdivided into 66 administrative villages (mubans).

Local administration 
There is one sub-district municipality (thesaban tambon) in the district:
 Nong Ya Sai consisting of parts of sub-district Nong Ya Sai.

There are six sub-district administrative organizations (SAO) in the district:
 Nong Ya Sai consisting of parts of sub-district Nong Ya Sai.
 Nong Ratchawat consisting of sub-district Nong Ratchawat.
 Nong Pho consisting of sub-district Nong Pho.
 Chaeng Ngam consisting of sub-district Chaeng Ngam.
 Nong Kham consisting of sub-district Nong Kham.
 Thap Luang consisting of sub-district Thap Luang.

References

External links
amphoe.com

Nong Ya Sai